Zion Hill may refer to:
 Thompson, Texas, also known as Zion Hill
 Zion Hill Mission, in Queensland, Australia

See also
 Zion's Hill or Hell's Gate, on the Dutch Caribbean island of Saba
 Zionhill, Pennsylvania, United States
 Zions Hill, an historic house in Dexter, Maine, United States
 Mount Zion (disambiguation)